"Aotearoa" is a song by New Zealand recording artist Stan Walker featuring Ria Hall, Troy Kingi and Maisey Rika. It was released as a single through Sony Music Australia on 21 July 2014. "Aotearoa" peaked at number two on the New Zealand Singles Chart.

An English version of the song was recorded and released on Walker's 2019 EP, Faith Hope Love.

Background
To celebrate te Wiki o te Reo Māori (Māori Language Week), Walker decided to release his first song completely in Māori, alongside other Kiwi artists Ria Hall, Troy Kingi and Maisey Rika. Inspired by the 1984 song "Poi E" by the Patea Māori Club, (which as of 2014 is the only Māori language song to reach number one on the New Zealand Singles Chart), Walker, Hall, Kingi and Rika took on the challenge to get another Maori song to number one in New Zealand. Of this initiative Walker says, "we all have to connect ourselves back to the mainland where we are all from. I have never been more proud to be Māori. It doesn't matter who you are or where you've come from, to live in New Zealand, you are us and we are you. We are one!" Hall calls the result "a song to celebrate our nation, our landscape, our uniqueness, our language and our people". A portion of the proceeds from "Aotearoa" went towards the Raukatauri Music Therapy Centre.

Video
A video was filmed with the artists in various locations around New Zealand, including Taupo and Whangarei. The director was Alice Orr.

Live performances 
On 21 July 2014, "Aotearoa" was performed live on Breakfast. On 23 July 2014, the song was performed live on The Edge.

Track listing
Digital download
 "Aotearoa" – 3:13

Chart performance
"Aotearoa" entered the New Zealand Singles Chart at number two on 28 July 2014; the following week, it fell to number seven.

Weekly charts

Year-end charts

Certifications

Release history

References 

Stan Walker songs
2014 songs
2014 singles
Sony Music Australia singles
Songs written by Stan Walker
Māori-language songs
Maisey Rika songs
Ria Hall songs
Troy Kingi songs
APRA Award winners
Songs written by Vince Harder